First on the Moon may refer to:

First on the Moon, a 2005 Russian mockumentary about a fictional 1930s Soviet landing on the Moon
First on the Moon (1970 book), the 1970 book by the Apollo 11 crew
The 1960 US title of Operation Columbus, a 1959 science fiction novel by Hugh Walters 
A 1958 novel by Jefferson Howard Sutton
First on the Moon: The Untold Story, a 2005 documentary